Major Ivan Hirst (1 March 1916 – 10 March 2000), was a British Army officer and engineer who was instrumental in reviving Volkswagen from a single factory in Wolfsburg, Germany, into a major postwar automotive manufacturer.

Education
Hirst was born in Saddleworth, West Riding of Yorkshire, England and attended Hulme Grammar School in Oldham, across the county boundary in Lancashire. His family had founded the Hirst Brothers Company, a manufacturer of watches, clocks and optical components in Oldham. He studied optical engineering at the University of Manchester, prior to forming his own company repairing optical instruments. While a student he was a member of the university's Officers' Training Corps contingent.

World War II
Hirst was commissioned as a second lieutenant in the 7th Battalion, Duke of Wellington's Regiment (Territorial Army) on 27 June 1934, and promoted to lieutenant three years later. A Captain on the outbreak of the Second World War, he was appointed adjutant on 1 October 1939. He transferred to the Royal Army Ordnance Corps (RAOC) as a Mechanical Engineering Officer on 14 November 1941, and to the Royal Electrical and Mechanical Engineers (REME) on its formation on 1 October 1942.

In the period after the D-Day landings, he was in charge of a tank repair facility in Belgium. He arrived in Germany in the summer of 1945, along with his colleague, Colonel Charles Radclyffe, when the British Army took control of the town of Wolfsburg. Russian ground troops had already located a factory in the town after crossing the Mittelland canal but were not interested in it. Then the US army found it but once again it held no interest. When the UK came across it, Hirst, sensing something was not right, quickly cleared some debris from the generating plant building and discovered it had been put there to disguise the fact that it was still operational. Hirst then found a pre-war prototype Volkswagen in a remote workshop on the site and realised that the factory could be used for producing cars for the British Army. Hence, Hirst and Radclyffe laid the foundations for Volkswagen's successful automotive business.

Much of the machinery had survived the bombing, having been stored in various outbuildings. Cars were put together with old-stock and whatever could be found, many using parts from the Kübelwagen until 1946, when the factory produced about 1,000 cars a month.

Hirst was fascinated by the potential of a four-wheel drive "Commanderwagon", which he was confident would sell to the French and Canadian forestry industries. He also liked the proven versatility of the Volkswagen chassis demonstrated by Ambi Budd, Karmann and other coachworks.

Hirst ended the war as a major.

Post-War specials
Two of the most significant 'special' cars developed by Volkswagen while under the control of the British were the 'Radclyffe Roadster', and a four-seater convertible, both custom-built by Rudolph Ringel. The Radclyffe was a two-seater roadster that was the transport of Colonel Charles Radclyffe over the summer months of 1946. The four-seater convertible was Ivan Hirst's personal transport.

Karmann was asked to build a four-seater, another coach-builder, Hebmüller, was asked to make a two-seater roadster. Its design was not unlike the 'Radclyffe Roadster', with a similar hood and side windows. The rear engine cover, however, was a hand-formed panel, not a converted front bonnet as was the Radclyffe version.

REME
The Corps of Royal Electrical and Mechanical Engineers (REME), to which Hirst belonged, has a relationship with Volkswagen which began in 1945 with a REME detachment using the factory to repair captured enemy vehicles and later to overhaul Willys MB and other British Army vehicle engines. Hirst, the Control Commission for Germany's British Senior Resident Officer, arrived at the Volkswagen factory in August of that year.

From 1946 the Volkswagen factory focus was on repairing and reconditioning Volkswagens and became known as 'No 2 REME Auxiliary Workshop'. As the company's prospects improved, the unit became essentially civilian-run but directed by the Army. The REME link ended when, on 6 September 1949, ownership transferred to the West German government. Since then VW has recognised the role that Ivan Hirst and the REME played in its rise from the ashes of the Second World War. A close bond exists between Volkswagen and REME to this day.

Memories
Hirst had strong memories of his time at Wolfsburg which he would share with local Volkswagen enthusiasts. The one strongest memory he would refer to regularly was the smell of the fish glue used to fix the cardboard headlinings in early cars. In later life, he became somewhat more reticent about his involvement, often saying that it was only by chance that he had been involved and that if he had not done it someone else would have.

Being a keen amateur photographer, his home was littered with images taken in the early days at Volkswagen, including one really early picture of a prototype coupe which was very similar to the Volkswagen Type 14A Hebmüller Cabriolet cars of the early 1950s.

Presentation of the model cars
Hirst once showed a friend a scale model of a Volkswagen Beetle that Volkswagen had presented to him. The 1:10 scale model, now on display in the REME Museum, was one of three made by Koch in Cologne. The second model was given to Colonel Charles Radclyffe; the third was presented to Heinrich Nordhoff, whom the British occupying authorities appointed managing director of Volkswagen in early 1948.

Later life
Hirst later joined the industry staff of the German section of the Foreign Office, where he stayed until 1955 when he joined the Organisation for European Economic Co-operation (OEEC) (before it became the Organisation for Economic Co-operation and Development (OECD) in 1961) in Paris until his retirement in 1975. Just one month earlier, he had appeared in an edition of the British Top Gear magazine, which revealed the story of how Major Hirst revived the Volkswagen car plant. He was also photographed driving a new front wheel-drive, front-engined Beetle in the magazine.

He had no children.

Honours
 A road in Wolfsburg, not far from Volkswagens factory buildings, is named in his honour "Major-Hirst-Straße" (Major-Hirst-Road).

References

Notes

Sources

http://www.mishalov.com/Hirst.html

                   

1916 births
2000 deaths
British automotive pioneers
People from Saddleworth
Royal Electrical and Mechanical Engineers officers
Royal Army Ordnance Corps officers
Duke of Wellington's Regiment officers
British Army personnel of World War II
Alumni of the University of Manchester
People educated at Oldham Hulme Grammar School
Volkswagen Group people